Punta Senyalada, also known as Pic de la Torreta and Pic dels Soldats, is a mountain of Catalonia, Spain. Located in the Besiberri Massif, Pyrenees, it has an elevation of 2,952 metres above sea level.

See also
Besiberri Massif
Mountains of Catalonia

References

External links
 Ressenya des Cavallers

Mountains of Catalonia
Mountains of the Pyrenees